Cazenovia Village Historic District is a national historic district located at Cazenovia in Madison County, New York.  It was added to the National Register of Historic Places in 1986.

Structures
The district contains 278 contributing buildings, one contributing site, and twelve contributing structures.  It consists of a wide variety of residential, commercial, civic, and ecclesiastical buildings built in popular architectural styles dating from about 1790 to 1935.

The Fugitive Slave Convention was held in Cazenovia in 1850.

See also 
 List of National Register of Historic Places in Cazenovia, New York

References

Historic districts on the National Register of Historic Places in New York (state)
Neoclassical architecture in New York (state)
1790 establishments in New York (state)
Historic districts in Madison County, New York
National Register of Historic Places in Cazenovia, New York